Zellik–Galmaarden is a European single day cycle race held in the Belgian region of Flanders. As of 2011, the race is organized as a 1.2 event on the UCI Europe Tour.

Winners

External links 
Official Website

Cycle races in Belgium
UCI Europe Tour races
Recurring sporting events established in 1983
1983 establishments in Belgium